Robert Witt may refer to:
 Robert Witt, a character from The Thin Red Line (1998 film)
 Sir Robert Witt (art historian) (1872–1952), British art historian
 Robert Witt (academic administrator) (born 1940), chancellor of the University of Alabama System
 Robert William Witt (1930–1967), neoclassical and experimental composer

See also
 Bob Witt, vaudeville performer and a member of the group Witt and Berg
 Bobby Witt (disambiguation)
 Witt (disambiguation)